Impatiens grandisepala is a species of flowering plant in the family Balsaminaceae. It is endemic to Cameroon, where it is known only from Mount Cameroon. It has been collected only once, in 1979. It is an epiphyte that grows in shady mountain forest habitat.

References

Endemic flora of Cameroon
grandisepala
Taxonomy articles created by Polbot